The 1995 BPR Kärcher Global Endurance GT was the second season of BPR Global GT Series.  It was a series for Grand Touring style cars broken into four classes based on power and manufacturer involvement, using names from GT1 to GT4.  It began on 26 February 1995 and ended 12 November 1995 after 12 races.

Schedule

Entries

GT1

GT2

GT3

Season results

References

External links
 1995 BPR Global GT Series season

BPR Global GT Series
BPR Global GT